Hermanos is a Spanish drama television series. Produced by Mediaset España in collaboration with Multipark Ficción, the 6-episode series aired on Telecinco from September to October 2014. Starring Antonio Velázquez, Álvaro Cervantes and María Valverde, the series—a generational story set in the 1980s and the 1990s— tracks the lives of three childhood friends.

Plot 
Starting in the mid 1980s in a working-class neighborhood of Madrid, two brothers—Juan (Antonio Velázquez) and Alberto (Álvaro Cervantes)—are in love with the same girl, their friend Virginia (María Valverde). Life takes each character to a singular path: the older brother, the brash Juan, puts aside his childhood dream of becoming a boxer and leaves Madrid for the shipyards of Vigo, becoming a trade union leader. Meanwhile, Alberto becomes a priced businessman, whereas Virginia attains her childhood goal of becoming a renowned journalist, entering the elite cultural circles, while also becoming a mother.

The friendship story (and love triangle) between the three characters intertwines with historical events such as the deindustrialization policies undertaken in Spain, the Balkan Wars, the rise of trade unionism or the so-called Movida madrileña.

Cast

Production and release 
The series was entirely shot in Madrid (and the wider Madrid region), Guadalajara and Vigo (primarily location shots of the port and the shipyards). A substantial part of the urban outdoor scenes portraying Madrid were shot in the residential area of Fuerte de San Francisco in Guadalajara, whose architecture preserves the aesthetics of the 1980s. Guadalajara also served as set to recreate the shipyards of Vigo as well as the city of Sarajevo.

Salvador Calvo directed episodes 1, 2, 5 and 6, while Joaquín Llamas directed episodes 3 and 4.

The miniseries premiered on 16 September 2014 on Telecinco. Broadcast every Tuesday night in prime time, the last episode aired on 21 October 2014.

Starting with "promising" audience scores in the opening episode (2,615,000 viewers; 15.9% share) the series attracted a relatively stable audience during the first 5 episodes. However, the viewership took a substantial dip in the finale, down to a 9.1% share, challenged by the nudist reality show  aired on the sister channel Cuatro and the return of Velvet on Antena 3.

Accolades

References 

Television series about brothers
Works about friendship
Television series set in the 1980s
Television series set in the 1990s
Television shows set in Madrid
Television shows set in Galicia (Spain)
Television shows filmed in Spain
2014 Spanish television series debuts
2014 Spanish television series endings
Spanish television miniseries
2010s Spanish drama television series
Telecinco network series
Television shows set in Sarajevo